SupremeSAT (Pvt) Ltd. is the first and only Sri Lankan satellite operator. It has partnership with satellite manufacturing institution China Great Wall Industry Corporation (CGWIC).

SupremeSAT deployed the first Sri Lankan satellite, Supreme SAT-I on November 12, 2012, launched on Long March 3B from Xichang, China.  Supreme SAT-I is jointly owned by China's CGWIC and SupremeSAT. SupremeSAT becomes the 27th private company in the world to own a satellite.

SupremeSAT is planned to invest over US$320 million, and planning to launch Sri Lanka's first ever communications satellite. It will be called SupremeSAT-III. The SupremeSAT-III will be providing all types of telecommunications services to Sri Lanka.SupremeSAT has laid foundation stone for the first 'Space Academy' at the Kandy BOI (Board of Investment). An investment of $20 million on Space Academy, which is targeting to train Sri Lankans in space and satellite technology. Also, a satellite ground station is to be built in Kokkala area to oversee satellite operations.

Satellite fleet

References

Communications satellite operators
Mass media companies of Sri Lanka
Companies established in 2011